John B. McColl (January 26, 1861 – February 24, 1940) was a Canadian politician.

Born in Murray Township, Northumberland County, Canada West, the son of John H. and Martha McColl, McColl was educated at the Public School and the High School of Trenton, Ontario. A lawyer, he was a Member of the Town Council of Cobourg for one year and Deputy Reeve and Commissioner of the Town Trust of Cobourg for one year. He was an unsuccessful candidate for the electoral district of Northumberland West at the general elections of 1896. A Liberal, he elected to the House of Commons of Canada in the 1900, 1904, and 1908 elections. He was defeated in the 1911 election.

References
 
 The Canadian Parliament; biographical sketches and photo-engravures of the senators and members of the House of Commons of Canada. Being the tenth Parliament, elected November 3, 1904

1861 births
1940 deaths
Liberal Party of Canada MPs
Members of the House of Commons of Canada from Ontario
People from Cobourg